Robert Ssentongo may refer to:

 Robert Ssentongo (footballer) (born 1988), Ugandan footballer
 Robert Ssentongo (surgeon), Ugandan plastic surgeon